Irfan bin Fandi Ahmad (born 13 August 1997), more commonly known as Irfan Fandi or mononymously as Irfan, is a Singaporean professional footballer who plays as a centre-back for Thai League 1 club BG Pathum United and the Singapore national team. Earlier in his career, he played as a striker and a winger before converting into a centre-back. In 2013, he was listed as one of Goal.com's Top 20 Southeast Asian Rising Stars. In 2014, Irfan was also named as one of the top 40 best young talents in world football on The Guardian.

Irfan began his footballing career by going through the youth system at the National Football Academy (NFA), with subsequent stints and trials at various clubs before debuting as a professional at the age of 18 at top tier Chilean Primera División side Universidad Católica in 2015. Although Irfan was offered a two-year contract by the club, he rejected it to return to Singapore. For the next three years, Irfan played for local clubs the Young Lions and Home United. Around this time, he went on trials with Dutch Eredivisie side FC Groningen and Portuguese Primeira Liga side S.C. Braga, rejecting a contract offer from the latter.

In 2018, Irfan signed for Thailand's BG Pathum United FC prior to the 2019 Thai League 2 season, where he was instrumental to the club's immediate promotion back to the Thai League 1 and soon after when the club become the Champions of Thailand during the 2021–22 Thai League 1 season – becoming the first Singaporean to win Thailand's top tier league trophy. During their title winning season, Irfan led BG Pathum's defence with the club only losing a single game the entire season, while conceding just 11 goals in 24 matches and keeping 15 clean sheets.

Irfan made his senior international debut for Singapore in 2016, with a single goal as a centre-back coming against Turkmenistan in 2017, and earning 38 caps as of 2022. He has represented his country at various international tournaments, including the 2018 and 2020 AFF Championships, the 2019 AFC Asian Cup qualification as well as the AFC 2022 FIFA World Cup qualification rounds.

Early life and family
Irfan was born on 13 August 1997 in Singapore. Irfan is the eldest son of Singaporean footballing legend Fandi Ahmad and former model Wendy Jacobs. He has four siblings, younger brothers Ikhsan, a club teammate who plays for BG Pathum United as well as Ilhan, who plays for Young Lions and Iryan, who plays for Hougang United under-17 and the other being his sister Iman.

Irfan attended the Singapore Sports School at Woodlands.

Club career

Youth
Irfan started his career by going through the youth system of the National Football Academy (NFA).

In March 2013, Irfan had an opportunity to secure his first overseas stint, which was supposed to be with Hércules, a second-tier Spanish professional club. However, he failed to secure a contract with the club due to visa issues. He later joined Chilean side A.C. Barnechea, signing a two-year contract with the Chilean Primera División club.

Universidad Católica 
Irfan then joined Chilean Primera División club Universidad Católica in 2014 and made his first team debut the following year, appearing from the bench for the club's senior team in the 81st minute, when Universidad Católica were leading 4-0 against San Luis de Quillota. However, Irfan later rejected a two-year contract from the club in order to return to Singapore and fulfil his National Service obligations.

Young Lions
On 5 March 2015, it was announced that Irfan would join S.League side Young Lions for the 2015 S.League season on a six-month contract. On the same day, he was immediately named in the starting line-up to face Tampines Rovers, due to an injury suffered by Shakir Hamzah.

Home United
In January 2016, it was announced that Irfan signed a two-year contract for Home United for the upcoming 2016 S.League season along with his brother, Ikhsan. He scored a brace against Balestier Khalsa in only his second start of the season after being away for most of the season due to National Service commitments.

On 14 March 2017, Puma was revealed to have signed Irfan on a two-year sponsorship deal. Irfan's former club Club Deportivo Universidad Católica was also reportedly interested in re-signing him following the completion of his national service.

Irfan scored his first goal for the 2017 S.League season in a 0–2 victory over Hougang United, later following up with his first at the continental level, scoring in the 24th minute against Yadanarbon F.C. to give his side a 3–0 lead in an eventual 4–1 win. The win saw Home United become the first side to advance to the zonal semi-finals. Irfan was later nominated for the S.League's Young Player of the Season award. His performances also drew the attention of Thailand's BG Pathum United, which he would eventually sign for, and was offered also offered a trial with English side Leeds United in December 2017.

Return to Young Lions
Irfan returned to join the Young Lions after his national service for the 2018 Singapore Premier League season.

In February 2018, Irfan, together with his brother, Ikhsan, went on trials at Eredivisie club, Groningen. He also went on another trial with Portuguese top-tier side, S.C. Braga, and was later offered a two-year deal, with the club retaining the option to extend the contract by two additional years. Irfan rejected the offer, citing that he felt lonely and homesick during his brief stint with the club. He also added that the clause of having to fork out a hefty compensation of 15 million euros should he decide to leave the club during the contract was one of the other reasons that he did not accept it. Irfan eventually rejoined the Young Lions and ended the season with 22 appearances with 3 goals.

BG Pathum United
On 11 November 2018, it was confirmed that Irfan would join BG Pathum United to fill up the club's ASEAN slot for the 2019 Thai League 2 season. Irfan agreed to join the Thai side despite their relegation as they had been interested in signing him for two years. In his first season, he helped BG Pathum secure promotion back to the Thai League 1. Irfan was sent off in the first half of his first top-flight game in Thailand, when BG Pathum trailed Muangthong United 1–0. The club eventually won the game 2–1. 

Irfan became the first Singaporean to win the Thai League 1 title after his club swooped to the title having garnered an unassailable 19-point cushion over second-placed Buriram United, with six games left. Irfan was key to their triumph with the defence having only conceded just 11 goals in 24 matches, while keeping 15 clean sheets.

Irfan won his fourth silverware in the form of the 2022 Thailand Champions Cup with BG Pathum in a 3-2 win over Buriram.

International career

Youth
Irfan was part of the Singapore U16 side in the 25th edition of the Canon Lion City Cup held in 2013, impressing against Arsenal U15 and Eintracht Frankfurt U15. He made his Singapore U23 debut on 14 February 2015, scoring against the Japan U22s, and was selected by coach Aide Iskandar for the 2015 Southeast Asian Games.

Senior
In September 2016, Irfan was called up by national team coach V. Sundramoorthy for the friendlies against Malaysia and Hong Kong on 7 October and 11 October respectively. He made his debut for the senior national team against Hong Kong at the Mongkok Stadium. He earned his second cap in a friendly against Afghanistan before securing his first start against Bahrain in Singapore's first third-round match of the 2019 AFC Asian Cup qualification, helping the Lions earn a 0-0 away draw.

Irfan was selected as part of the Singapore Selection squad for The Sultan of Selangor's Cup to be held on 6 May 2017. He also made his AFF Championship debut in the 2018 iteration on 9 November, with a 1–0 win over Indonesia.

Irfan received a call up to the national team for a friendly against Afghanistan and the 2022 FIFA World Cup qualification matches held in Riyadh against Palestine, Uzbekistan, and Saudi Arabia along with brothers, Ikhsan and Ilhan. This was the first time all three brothers of were called up.

On 25 December 2021, in the second leg of the 2020 AFF Championship semi-final match against Indonesia, Irfan was controversially sent off in the 67th minute after tackling down Irfan Jaya for allegedly denying a goalscoring opportunity. 

On 26 March 2022, against Malaysia, Irfan played alongside his younger brothers Ikhsan and Ilhan. It was the first time that the three Fandi brothers played in the same match for the national team together. It was also the first time in Singapore's history to have three brothers playing for the national team. The Singapore team won 2–1 thanks to a brace from his younger brother Ikhsan.

Personal life
Irfan, along with his brother Ikhsan, served their National Service (NS) obligations for the Singapore Armed Forces (SAF) from 2016 to 2018. During their stint, they had continued to play and train professional football under the SAF Sportsmen Scheme by the Ministry of Defence (MINDEF) that gives special dispensation for local athletes with flexible timetables for sports events – including representing Singapore at international competitions.

Career statistics

Club

International

International caps

International goals
Scores and results list Singapore's goal tally first.

International U23 goals

Honours
BG Pathum United
 Thai League 1: 2020–21
 Thai League 2: 2019
 Thailand Champions Cup: 2021, 2022

Singapore U-22
 Merlion Cup: 2019

Notes

References

External links

1997 births
Living people
Singaporean footballers
Singapore international footballers
Singaporean expatriate footballers
Singapore Sports School alumni
Club Deportivo Universidad Católica footballers
A.C. Barnechea footballers
Singapore Premier League players
Expatriate footballers in Chile
Singaporean people of Malay descent
Singaporean people of South African descent
Association football forwards
Association football defenders
Competitors at the 2017 Southeast Asian Games
Competitors at the 2019 Southeast Asian Games
Singapore youth international footballers
Southeast Asian Games silver medalists for Singapore